The 2022–23 B.League season is the seventh season of the Japanese B.League.

For the 2022–23 season, the B1 division has 24 teams, and the three-conference system of East, Central, and West was restored for the first time since the 2019–20 season. The B2 division remained a two-conference system with 14 teams, the same as the previous season.

References 

2022–23 in Asian basketball leagues
B.League
B.League seasons